Gunnar Nygaard may refer to:

Gunnar Nygaard (broadcaster) (1897–1997), Norwegian radio broadcaster
Gunnar Nygaard (phycologist) (1903–2002), Danish phycologist